is a manga artist from Ibaraki prefecture who works for Square Enix.  He is best known for Mahoraba, which was published in Gangan WING and adapted as an anime television show broadcast on TV Tokyo. He often represented himself in Mahoraba as a monolith with eyes and limbs.

Works
Mahoraba
Manabiya
Seiken Shōjo Maniacs
Wa!
Yonakano Reijini Haremu Wo!
Mahou moto Shoujo Meruhen Kururu

References

External links

Manga artists
People from Ibaraki Prefecture
Living people
Year of birth missing (living people)